Elmwood Park School District may refer to:
 Elmwood Park Community Unit School District 401 (Illinois)
 Elmwood Park Public Schools (New Jersey)